Epicentr K (Epitsentr K) is a national chain of stores in Ukraine that specializes in home improvement and gardening. The company is one of the first in Ukraine to introduce a chain of home improvement stores and has successfully expanded across the country over the last decade.

The company was the first in Ukraine to come up with wholesale stores in Ukraine. Currently Epicentr K is very similar to many stores in the United States such as Home Depot, Lowe's, or Menards. In 2008, the company became the title sponsor of the Ukrainian Premier League in football. As of 2018, the company had plans to bring the total number of stores to 53 nationwide. Despite the economic crisis of 2008–2009 the company continued to expand.

History
The company was established on 6 December 2003 and the first store opened in Kyiv on Bratyslavska street. In 2005, two more stores were built in Kyiv.

In 2006, the first three stores were built outside Kyiv: Lviv, Poltava, and Odesa. In 2007, eight stores were built nationwide including one in Kryvyi Rih. As of 2008, there were 16 stores built with eight more projected. In 2009, the company expanded its offerings to include consumer goods in addition to building materials.

On 11 December 2009 the company opened  store, the largest of its kind in Ukraine. The store is recognized as "The World's Largest Trading Center of DIY format" by the Book of Records of Ukraine.

In 2019, the agrarian operations of Epicenter K expanded after its owners purchased 1,364 hectares.

Stores
Each store has a big overflow and free parking. In each store you can find also a cafe and a bank. The company offers a possibility of custom design on a wide selection of its products as well as delivery and an express delivery.

Contributions
The company also helps with the construction of the Kyivan Spiritual Academy and participates in a wide variety of sponsorship throughout the country: Gert Goff show commemorated to 750-year anniversary of Lviv, jubilee concerts of Pavlo Zibrov and Valentyna Stepova, and many others.

The company carries a collection of awards such as "The Brand of the Year" (2008).

Sport
For some period, the company was a sponsor of the Ukrainian Premier Football League and the Ukraine national football team (Ukrainian Association of Football).

Starting in 2019 the company's sponsorship made possible for one of the Ukrainian provincial football clubs from Dunaivtsi organize into a competitive collective and participate in football competitions at national level (FC Epitsentr Dunaivtsi).

Destruction of Epicentr K store in Mariupol during Russian mass bombing 
During the 2022 Russian invasion of Ukraine, the Epicenter K in Mariupol suffered significant damage during a mass bombing on 2 March as part of the Siege of Mariupol.

References

External links
Epicentr K Sports Club 

Retail companies of Ukraine
Economy of Kyiv
Ukrainian brands
Industrial supply companies
Ukrainian companies established in 2003
Retail companies established in 2003
Hardware stores
Home improvement companies